Jack Fitzpatrick (born 1998) is an Irish hurler who plays for Galway Senior Championship club Killimordaly and at inter-county level with the Galway senior hurling team. He usually lines out as a full-back.

Honours

Galway
National Hurling League (1): 2021
Leinster Under-21 Hurling Championship (1): 2018
All-Ireland Minor Hurling Championship (1): 2015

References

1998 births
Living people
University of Galway hurlers
Killimordaly hurlers
Galway inter-county hurlers